Prophaecasia anthion is a moth of the family Tortricidae first described by Alexey Diakonoff in 1973. It is found in Sri Lanka and Borneo.

References

Moths of Asia
Moths described in 1973